Hardt is an Ortsgemeinde – a community belonging to a Verbandsgemeinde – in the Westerwaldkreis in Rhineland-Palatinate, Germany.

Geography

The community lies in the Westerwald between Limburg and Siegen. The river Nister, which is part of the Sieg drainage basin, flows east to west through the municipal area. Hardt belongs to the Verbandsgemeinde of Bad Marienberg, a kind of collective municipality. Its seat is in the like-named town.

Politics

The municipal council is made up of 8 council members who were elected in a majority vote in a municipal election on 7 June 2009.

Economy and infrastructure

Transport
The nearest Autobahn interchanges are Montabaur on the A 3 (Cologne–Frankfurt), some 27 km away, and Haiger/Burbach on the A 45 (Dortmund–Hanau), some 25 km away. The nearest InterCityExpress stop is the railway station at Montabaur on the Cologne-Frankfurt high-speed rail line.

References

External links
 Hardt in the collective municipality’s Web pages 

Municipalities in Rhineland-Palatinate
Westerwaldkreis